The 27th District of the Iowa House of Representatives in the state of Iowa.

Current elected officials
Joel Fry is the representative currently representing the district.

Past representatives
The district has previously been represented by:
 Jewell O. Waugh, 1971–1973
 James D. Wells, 1973–1981
 Richard Running, 1981–1983
 Paul G. Copenhaver, 1983–1985
 Joseph M. Kremer, 1985–1993
 Darrell R. Hanson, 1993–1995
 Joseph M. Kremer, 1995–1999
 Michael D. Jager, 1999–2001
 Andra Atteberry, 2001–2003
 Pam Jochum, 2003–2009
 Charles Isenhart, 2009–2013
 Joel Fry, 2013–present

References

027